Captain Napier George Henry Sturt, 3rd Baron Alington (1 November 1896 – 17 September 1940) was a British peer, the son of Humphrey Sturt, 2nd Baron Alington.

He was born in November 1896 in the St. Marylebone district of London. He succeeded to the Barony on 30 July 1919 on the death of his father. He owned the Crichel House estate in Dorset.

He married Lady Mary Sibell Ashley-Cooper, daughter of Anthony Ashley-Cooper, 9th Earl of Shaftesbury, on 27 November 1928. They had one child: Mary Anna Sibell Elizabeth Sturt (b. 1929, d. 2010) who later fought the Government and won, leading to the resignation of a Minister, in the Crichel Down Affair.

Alington may well be most notable for having dated Tallulah Bankhead in the 1920s. Alington was described as "well cultivated, bisexual, with sensuous, meaty lips, a distant, antic charm, a history of mysterious disappearances, and a streak of cruelty." His bisexuality was well known. He was a friend of the Polish composer Karol Szymanowski who dedicated his highly sensuous Songs of an infatuated Muezzin Op.42 to the handsome young Englishman, on their publication in 1922.

He had no male heir upon his death, so the title became extinct. The Crichel estate passed to his 11-year-old daughter Mary, who later married Commander George (known as "Toby") Marten.

War service
In World War I, he was a captain in the Royal Air Force. In World War II, he served in the Royal Air Force Volunteer Reserve. He was commissioned on 2 July 1940 as an officer in the Administrative and Special Duties Branch and was posted to Cairo, possibly serving as a staff officer at HQ Middle East. He died on 16 September 1940, aged 43, in Cairo on active service, of a short illness after pneumonia, and was buried in the New British Protestant Cemetery, Cairo, Egypt, plot E.221-222

References

1896 births
1940 deaths
Barons Alington (third creation)
Deaths from pneumonia in Egypt
Bisexual men
British bisexual people
LGBT military personnel
LGBT peers
Royal Air Force group captains
Royal Air Force Volunteer Reserve personnel of World War II
Royal Air Force personnel of World War I
English LGBT politicians
Conservative Party (UK) hereditary peers
Younger sons of barons
Royal Air Force personnel killed in World War II
20th-century British LGBT people
People from Marylebone
Military personnel from London